Daiana Cardone  (born 1 January 1989) is an Argentine former footballer who played as a defender.

She was part of the Argentina women's national football team  at the 2008 Summer Olympics. On club level she played for Independiente.

See also
 Argentina at the 2008 Summer Olympics

References

External links
FIFA.com
http://www.footballscores24.com/argentina/players/daiana-cardone-145516/

1989 births
Living people
Argentine women's footballers
Argentina women's international footballers
Place of birth missing (living people)
Footballers at the 2008 Summer Olympics
Olympic footballers of Argentina
Women's association football defenders